"Showbiz (The Battle)" is the debut solo single of French singer M. Pokora, also appearing in the self-titled debut solo album M. Pokora. The single cover credits him as Matt Pokora. In 2005, Pokora was forced to change his chosen name from Matt Pokora to M. Pokora after a lawsuit from French R&B singer Matt Houston who used the mononym Matt. As a result, re-released the album as M. Pokora and later covers of "Showbiz (The Battle)" credit him as M. Pokora.

It was released on 15 November 2004 on the ULM label, part of Universal. It was written and composed by Georges Padey, Kore & Skalp, Matthieu Tota (M. Pokora) and Da Team and was produced by Kore & Skalp (Djamel Fezari and Pascal Koeu).

Track listing
"Showbiz (The Battle)" (Radio Edit) (3:10)	
"Showbiz (The Battle)" (Club Version) (4:33)

Charts

References

M. Pokora songs
2004 singles
French-language songs
Songs written by Skalp
Songs written by M. Pokora
2004 songs
Universal Music Group singles
Songs written by Kore (producer)